Proposed by George John Romanes, introspection by analogy is "a technique for studying animal behavior by assuming that the same mental process that occurs in the observer’s mind also occurs in the animals mind".

References

Ethology